William A. Goldring (born 1942/1943) is an American billionaire businessman, chairman of the Sazerac Company, and head of the American family that owns Sazerac, the second-largest spirits company in the US.

Early life
He is the son of Stephen Goldring and Mathilde "Teal" Goldring. He was brought up in New Orleans and earned a bachelor's degree in business from Tulane University.

His grandfather, Newman Goldring, founded Sazerac in 1898 in Pensacola, Florida.

Career
Goldring is chairman of the Sazerac Company and of Crescent Crown Distributing, the second-largest beer wholesaler in the US.

Personal life
Goldring has three children, Jeffrey Goldring, who works for Sazerac, as well as Diane Franco and Marc Goldring.

Goldring is a member of the board of trustees of The National WWII Museum, New Orleans.

Honors
In 2011, Goldring was awarded The Times-Picayune Loving Cup, awarded annually since 1901 for philanthropy in the New Orleans area.

In 2012, The New Orleans Wine and Food Experience presented Goldring with the Ella Brennan Lifetime Achievement Award for his philanthropy.

References

1940s births
American chairpersons of corporations
Living people
Tulane University alumni
American billionaires